Glenea vaga is a species of beetle in the family Cerambycidae. It was described by James Thomson in 1865. It is known from Myanmar, Laos, Thailand and Malaysia. It contains the varietas Glenea vaga var. flavocolorata.

References

vaga
Beetles described in 1865